Datuk Seri Haji Johari bin Abdul Ghani (Jawi: جوهري بن عبدالغني, born 6 March 1964) is a Malaysian politician and chartered accountant who has served as the Member of Parliament (MP) for Titiwangsa from May 2013 to May 2018 and again since November 2022. He served as the Minister of Finance II in the Barisan Nasional (BN) administration under former Prime Minister Najib Razak from June 2016 to the collapse of the BN administration in May 2018 and Deputy Minister of Finance in the BN administration under Prime Minister and Minister Najib from July 2015 to his promotion in June 2016. He is a member of the United Malays National Organisation (UMNO), a component party of the Barisan Nasional (BN) coalition. He has also served as the Vice President of UMNO since March 2023.

Johari was the Minister of Finance II (2016–2018). He is a qualified Chartered Accountant and he is a Fellow of the Chartered Association of Certified Accountants.

Early life 
Born and raised in the high educated area of Kampung Pandan, Kuala Lumpur in 1964, Johari received his primary school education at Sekolah Rendah Kebangsaan Kampung Pandan (now known as SRK Tun Hussein Onn) from 1971 to 1976 and pursued his studies at Sekolah Menengah Aminuddin Baki in Kampung Pandan from 1977 until 1981. He continued his tertiary education at Institut Teknologi MARA (ITM), Shah Alam from 1982 until 1985 and obtained his Diploma in Accounting. He then furthered his accounting studies in the UK, which qualified him for membership to the Chartered Association of Certified Accountants in 1988 and awarded Fellowship of the Chartered Association of Certified Accountants in 1993.

Profession and Corporate Career 
Johari started his career at an international accounting firm, Peat Marwick & Co. (now known as KPMG) as an auditor. Johari was active in the corporate world for more than 25 years. He held several senior positions, including group managing director and chairman in several companies, both listed and unlisted in the Kuala Lumpur Stock Exchange. He also held positions as managing directors of companies involved in the fast food industries, manufacturing and agriculture.

Johari is active in various social and community services. He was appointed chairman of ‘Jawatankuasa Pemakanan Negara’ at the Ministry of Agriculture and Agro-based Industry.  He was also a member of ‘Lembaga Pelawat Hospital Kuala Lumpur’ and member of ‘Jawatankuasa Badan Amal & Aduan Rakyat Wilayah Persekutuan’.

Johari sits on the Malaysia Economic Council. The council, which is chaired by the Prime Minister of Malaysia, is responsible, among others, to formulate strategies to sustain the economic growth of Malaysia through foreign direct investment and domestic investments for the country and to monitor and analyze trends in the development of both global and domestic economy in order to formulate specific actions to spur the Malaysian economic growth.

Johari was also a member of the board of directors of Khazanah Nasional Berhad, the sovereign wealth fund of the Government of Malaysia. He is also the chairman of the Langkawi Development Authority (LADA), a government agency responsible for the development of the Langkawi Island as an international tourist destination. Johari was formerly the chairman of UDA Holdings Berhad, a government linked company that is involved in urban development. Datuk Seri Johari is a member of the board of trustees for the Yayasan Pelaburan Bumiputera, the parent company of Permodalan Nasional Berhad which manages more than RM250 billion unit trust funds in Malaysia. Johari is active in the Yayasan Peneraju Pendidikan Bumiputera (YPPB) where he serves on the board of trustees. The YPPB is a strategic unit under the Prime Minister's Office established to strengthen Bumiputeras’ capability and expertise in the economy and education.

He is a founder and currently the chairman of Yayasan Bena Nusa and a board member of the Yayasan Pendidikan Titiwangsa, both of which were established to help to reduce urban poverty and improve educational outcomes for children of the urban poor.

Political career 
Johari has been active in politics for more than 24 years since 1988. He has held various positions in UMNO and BN of Titiwangsa. In June 2010, he was made the Acting Chief of UMNO's Division of Titiwangsa and appointed as Barisan Nasional Coordinating Chairman for the Titiwangsa parliamentary constituency. Concerned with community issues raised by the Titiwangsa Parliament, he established a Community Service Center in Titiwangsa in July 2010. Amongst the major concerns of the Titiwangsa Parliament community were poverty, squatters’ settlement, infrastructure, vendors and others. The Community Service Center operated on Mondays to Fridays from 9.00 am to 5.00 pm.

During the 2013 general election, he was chosen to contest and won the Titiwangsa parliamentary seat and on 27 July 2015, he was appointed as the Deputy Minister of Finance. Following a cabinet reshuffle on 27 June 2016, Johari was appointed as the Minister of Finance II.

However, in the 2018 general election, Johari failed to retain the Titiwangsa parliamentary seat, losing by a 4,139-vote majority to Rina Harun, the Woman's Chief of the PPBM, a component party of Pakatan Harapan.

Election results

Honour and Award 
In recognition of his efforts in the areas of community, social, politics, corporate and business, he was conferred the Darjah Kebesaran Negeri Selangor (D.S.I.S) by Sultan Sharifuddin Idris Shah of Selangor which carries the title Dato’ in 2003. In 2005, he was conferred the Darjah Kebesaran Persekutuan Panglima Jasa Negara (P.J.N.) by the Yang di-Pertuan Agong XII Tuanku Syed Sirajuddin Ibni Al-Marhum Tuanku Syed Putra Jamalullail which carries the title Datuk. On 1 February 2017, he was conferred with Darjah Seri Mahkota Wilayah (S.M.W.) by the Yang di-Pertuan Agong XV Sultan Muhammad V which carries the title Datuk Seri.

Honour of Malaysia
 : 
  Commander of the Order of Meritorious Service (PJN) – Datuk  (2005)
 :
 Knight Companion of the Order of Sultan Sharafuddin Idris Shah (DSIS) – Dato’ (2003)
 :
 Grand Commander of the Order of the Territorial Crown (SMW) – Datuk Seri (2017)

References 

1964 births
Living people
Kuala Lumpur politicians
Malaysian people of Malay descent
Malaysian Muslims
Malaysian accountants
Malaysian businesspeople
United Malays National Organisation politicians
Members of the Dewan Rakyat
Members of the 15th Malaysian Parliament
Government ministers of Malaysia
Finance ministers of Malaysia
Commanders of the Order of Meritorious Service
21st-century Malaysian politicians